West of Shanghai is a 1937 American adventure film directed by John Farrow and starring Boris Karloff as a Chinese warlord. It is based on the 1920 Porter Emerson Browne play The Bad Man. Three other films, all titled The Bad Man, are also based on the same play: 
 in 1923, directed by Edwin Carewe and starring Holbrook Blinn
 in 1930, directed by Clarence Badger and starring Walter Huston
 in 1941, starring Wallace Beery and Ronald Reagan and directed by Richard Thorpe.

Plot
On a train bound for lawless northern China, businessman Gordon Creed (Ricardo Cortez) encounters acquaintance Myron Galt (Douglas Wood) and his attractive daughter Lola (Sheila Bromley). Galt is on his way to foreclose on a very promising oilfield built up by Jim Hallet (Gordon Oliver). Creed, on the other hand, wants to offer Hallet enough money to pay off his loan from Galt (for a tidy share of the oilfield).

Creed is annoyed when his reserved compartment is appropriated by General Chow Fu-Shan (Vladimir Sokoloff). The general is on his way to deal with self-styled General Wu Yen Fang (Boris Karloff), a warlord who has taken control of a province. However, Chow Fu-Shan is assassinated on the train by one of Fang's men.

After being questioned by military governor General Ma (Tetsu Komai), the three travel by horse to a remote town, where they find not only Hallet (Gordon Oliver), but Creed's estranged wife Jane (Beverly Roberts), who is working for missionary Dr. Abernathy (Gordon Hart). Then, Fang's subordinate, Captain Kung Nui (Chester Gan) and his men take over the town. When Kung Nui casts his eyes on Jane, Hallet impulsively punches him. Jane and Hallet have fallen in love, though she does not believe in divorce and has kept their relationship strictly platonic. Hallet is knocked out and imprisoned.

When Fang arrives, he tries to persuade Jane to go with him, promising she would enjoy it (blithely explaining "I am Fang"). Hallet escapes with the help of an associate disguised as one of Fang's soldiers, and sends him to notify General Ma of Fang's whereabouts. Hallet then breaks in on Fang and Jane's private discussion. Fang remembers Hallet, who once hid a coolie and dug three bullets out of his shoulder; that was Fang before his meteoric rise. The warlord decides to help his benefactor. Fang robs Creed of $50,000, uses it to pay Galt what Hallet owes, then takes the money and offers it to Dr. Abernathy.

Creed bribes Captain Kung Nui to rebel against Fang. Kung Nui wants to regain face by having Hallet executed. Fang pretends to give in, but just before a firing squad shoots the oilman, Fang has his right-hand man, Mr. Cheng (Richard Loo), kill Kung Nui. Afterward, Fang personally shoots Creed to fix Hallet's romantic problem, but only manages to wound him.

Government troops arrive and force their way into the town. In the confusion, Jane, accompanied by Hallet, goes to attend to her husband's wound. Creed produces a gun and announces that Hallet is going to have a fatal accident, but is killed by Fang.

With the battle lost, Fang decides to surrender rather than risk the lives of his captives by fighting to the end. He is taken out and shot.

Cast
 Boris Karloff as General Wu Yen Fang
 Beverly Roberts as Mrs. Jane Creed
 Ricardo Cortez as Gordon Creed
 Gordon Oliver as Jim Hallet
 Sheila Bromley as Lola Galt
 Douglas Wood as Myron Galt 
 Vladimir Sokoloff as General Chow Fu-Shan
 Gordon Hart as Dr. Abernathy
 Richard Loo as Mr. Cheng
 Chester Gan as Captain Kung Nui
 Tetsu Komai as General Ma

Production
This was the second film John Farrow directed for Warner Bros.

Karloff was to make Black Widow for Warner Bros. But the studio pushed forward the film in their schedule to take advantage of the Second Sino-Japanese War.

It was known during production as China Bandit, then War Lord, then The Adventures of Fang. Filming took place in February 1937.

Willard Parker was to have made his debut in the film. Karloff's makeup required three hours of work per day; this was less time than was required for his non-human roles.

Reception
The New York Times wrote Karloff "admirably acquits himself as a comedian" in the film which nonetheless had "atmospheric validity" due to "numerous Chinese extras and an imaginative treatment of sets."

See also
 Boris Karloff filmography

References

External links

 
 
 
 

1937 films
1937 adventure films
American black-and-white films
American films based on plays
American adventure films
Films directed by John Farrow
Films produced by Hal B. Wallis
Films set in China
1930s English-language films
1930s American films